Stop AIDS may refer to:
Stop AIDS Campaign, British public health campaign
Stop AIDS Project, American public health campaign

See also
Student Stop AIDS Campaign